The AIR Awards of 2009 is the fourth annual Australian Independent Record Labels Association Music Awards (generally known as the AIR Awards and Jagermeister AIR Awards) and was an award ceremony at The Forum Theatre, in Melbourne, Australia on 23 November 2009 to recognise outstanding achievements of local artists who release their work through an Australian-owned independent record label and distribute their work through a locally-owned distribution firm.

The event was again sponsored by German liquor brand, Jägermeister and was filmed for a one-hour special on Australian pay-TV music broadcaster Channel V. The event was hosted by The Chaser's Julian Morrow.

AIR GM Nick O'Byrne told Billboard the awards are slowly attracting more corporate sponsorship, saying "As far as the awards themselves go, we're developing a history of recognising artists that are yet to hit widespread mainstream success - like Gotye and Hilltop Hoods did in 2006 - or are just starting to blossom like Geoffrey Gurrumul Yunupingu and British India last year and Blue King Brown the year before."

Performers

Nominees and winners

AIR Awards
Winners are listed first and highlighted in boldface; other final nominees are listed alphabetically.

See also
Music of Australia

References

2009 in Australian music
2009 music awards
AIR Awards